A long drink or tall drink is an alcoholic mixed drink with a relatively large volume (> 12 cl, frequently 16–40 cl or between 5–9 fluid ounces). In Finland, a ‘long drink’ specifically contains gin plus a mixer, almost always a fruit soda.

A long drink will have a tall glass full of mixer, in contrast to a short drink, or shooter, which has less mixer, or none. Short drinks are generally stronger since both types tend to contain the same amount of alcohol.  

A classic long drink is a Tom Collins. A simple style of long drink is the highball, a cocktail composed of one liquor and one mixer (excluding garnish or ice). A classic example of the highball is the Scotch and soda.

Finnish long drink

In Finland, long drink  (in Finnish lonkero) refers to a very popular mixed drink made from gin and a mixer, traditionally grapefruit soda, though many other flavours (almost always fruit) are available. It is ubiquitously available in Finnish stores, bars and restaurants.

References

Mixed drinks